is an interchange passenger railway station located in Kōhoku-ku, Yokohama, Kanagawa Prefecture, Japan, jointly managed by the private railway operator Tokyu Corporation and the Yokohama Municipal Subway.

Lines
Hiyoshi Station is served by the Tōkyū Tōyoko Line and Tōkyū Meguro Line.
It is also served by the underground Green Line.

Station layout
The Tokyu station is an elevated structure with two island platforms serving four tracks above ground. The station building is also connected to the Tokyu Store, a large upscale supermarket, and the reformed Tokyu Department Store on the second floor, which features many individually branded shops as well as a major consumer electronic shop (Yamada Denki) as a tenant occupying most of the third floor. The Yokohama Subway consists of a single island platform underground.

The Municipal Subway station has one island platforms serving two tracks for incoming trains to dock in alternating pattern.

The main fare gate concourse of Tokyu Railways is just above the Tokyu platforms which is before the Tokyu Store and bus terminal. The Tokyu Railways and Municipal Subway also share an integral underground fare gate concourse which is sandwiched between the platform levels of the two systems. The integral concourse allows quick interchange between the two systems.

Tokyu platforms

Yokohama Municipal Subway platforms

History
Hiyoshi Station opened as one of the original Tōyoko Line stations on 14 February 1926. The station was completely rebuilt in 1991 with half-submerged tracks and an elevated station building constructed above the tracks. The adjacent Tokyu Department store opened in 1995. The Yokohama Subway Green Line connected to Hiyoshi Station on March 30, 2008.

As a result, the station was assigned station number SH03 when these services began revenue operations.

Since the opening of the Shin-Yokohama Line, most southbound express trains of the Meguro Line continue onward to the Shin-Yokohama Line instead of terminating at Hiyoshi, while about half of the Meguro Line local trains remain terminating at/departing from Hiyoshi. Only some of the southbound express trains of the Tōyoko Line enter Shin-Yokohama Line.

Passenger statistics
In fiscal 2019, the Tokyu station was used by an average of 206,301 passengers daily. During the same period, the Yokohama Municipal Subway was used by an average of 84,908 passengers daily,

The daily average passenger figures for previous years (boarding passengers only) are as shown below.

Surrounding area
Keio University Hiyoshi Campus
 Keio University Yagami Campus (Faculty of Science and Engineering)
 Keio Senior High School
 Nihon University High School / Junior High School
 Tokyo College of Photography

See also
 List of railway stations in Japan

References

External links

 Tokyu station information 
 Yokohama Subway station information 

Railway stations in Kanagawa Prefecture
Railway stations in Japan opened in 1926
Tokyu Toyoko Line
Tokyu Meguro Line
Green Line (Yokohama)
Stations of Tokyu Corporation
Railway stations in Yokohama